The Order of the Golden Heart (Orden ng Gintong Puso) is an order of the Philippines.

History 
Created by Executive Order 40-A dated June 21, 1954, the Golden Heart Presidential Award was upgraded to the Order of the Golden Heart by Executive Order 236 on September 19, 2003.

Criteria 
The Order of the Golden Heart gives official recognition to Filipino or foreign citizens who have rendered distinguished services or given noteworthy monetary or other material aid, encouragement to the campaign for the amelioration and improvement of the moral, social, and economic conditions of the Filipino masses, and for volunteerism in the service of the Filipino masses.

Ranks 
The Order of the Golden Heart shall be composed of the following ranks:

 Grand Collar (GCGH) (Maringal na Kuwintas): Conferred upon a former or incumbent head of State and/or of government, see photo.

 Grand Cross (GCrGH) (Maringal na Krus): Conferred upon a Crown Prince, Vice President, Senate President, Speaker of the House, Chief Justice or the equivalent, foreign minister or other official of cabinet rank; or upon an Ambassador, Undersecretary, Assistant Secretary, or other person of a rank similar or equivalent to the foregoing

 Grand Officer (GOGH) (Maringal na Pinuno): Conferred upon a Chargé d'affaires, e.p., Minister, Minister Counselor, Consul General heading a consular post, Executive Director, or other person of a rank similar or equivalent to the foregoing

 Commander (CGH) (Komandante): Chargé d'affaires, a.i., Counselor, First Secretary, Consul General in the consular section of an Embassy, Consular officer with a personal rank higher than Second Secretary, Director, or other person of a rank similar or equivalent to the foregoing

 Officer (OGH) (Pinuno): Conferred upon a Second Secretary, Consul, Assistant Director, or other person of a rank similar or equivalent to the foregoing

 Member (MGH) (Kagawad): Conferred upon a Third Secretary, Vice Consul, Attaché, Principal Assistant, or other person of a rank similar or equivalent to the foregoing

Insignia 
 The Ribbon of the Order is red. The award had a tricolor blue, white, red ribbon
 The badge and the plaque is a green-enamelled Maltese cross with an oval golden medallion representing hands open to a golden shining heart, surmounted by a reverse motto "MANUM TUAM APERVIT INOPE", the whole medallion surrounded by a green crown of laurel, and between the branches, golden laces and green leaves.
 The badge was originally designed as a medal by Gilbert Perez and later modified into the badge of the Order by Galo Ocampo.

Notable recipients 
The following names were based on the roster of recipients from the Malacañang Protocol Office:

Conferred by Ramon Magsaysay 
 Carlos P. Romulo, Member (Kagawad), 13 September 1954; Grand Cross (Maringal na Krus), 1954
 Helen Keller, Grand Collar (Maringal na Kuwintas), 20 March 1955

Conferred by Carlos Garcia 
 Ramon Magsaysay, Grand Collar (Maringal na Kuwintas), 1958 (posthumous)
 Manuel Quezon,  Grand Collar (Maringal na Kuwintas), 19 August 1960 (posthumous)

Conferred by Diosdado Macapagal 
 Queen Sirikit of Thailand, 1963
 Gemma Cruz-Araneta, 1964

Conferred by Ferdinand E. Marcos Sr. 
 Siti Hartinah, Grand Collar (Maringal na Kuwintas), 1968
 Dr. Clark Bloom, Golden Heart Presidential Award, 1971
 Dr. Robert F. Chandler, Grand Cross (Maringal na Krus), 1971
  Queen Ratna,  Grand Collar (Maringal na Kuwintas), 1971
 Kwa Geok Choo,  Golden Heart Presidential Award, 15 January 1974
 Dr. Charles P. Bailey, Grand Collar (Maringal na Kuwintas), 1975
 Dr. Denton Cooley, Grand Collar (Maringal na Kuwintas), 1975
 Dr. Christiaan Barnard, Grand Collar (Maringal na Kuwintas), 1975
 Cristóbal Martínez-Bordiú, 10th Marquis of Villaverde, Grand Collar (Maringal na Kuwintas), 1975
 Talal bin Abdulaziz, Grand Collar (Maringal na Kuwintas), 1983
 Peace Corps in the Philippines, Golden Heart Presidential Award, 1983
 Imelda Marcos, Grand Collar (Maringal na Kuwintas)
 Suharto,  Grand Collar (Maringal na Kuwintas)

Conferred by Corazon Aquino 
 Dr. K. Ramiah, Grand Cross (Maringal na Krus)
 M.S. Swaminathan, Grand Cross (Maringal na Krus), 1987
  Santanina Tillah Rasul, Grand Cross (Maringal na Krus), 29 June 1988

Conferred by Fidel Ramos
 Fr. Pierre Tritz, SJ, Grand Cross (Maringal na Krus), 8 October 1993
 Manuel Manahan, Grand Cross (Maringal na Krus), 20 April 1994
 Dr. Klaus Lampe, Grand Cross (Maringal na Krus), 19 May 1995
  The Rockefeller Brothers, Grand Cross (Maringal na Krus), 31 August 1996
 Eduardo Ermita, Grand Cross (Maringal na Krus), 2 September 1997
 Fortunato Abat, Grand Cross (Maringal na Krus), 2 September 1997
  Ruben Torres, Grand Cross (Maringal na Krus), 2 September 1997
 Orlando S. Mercado, Grand Cross (Maringal na Krus), 13 May 1998
 Emilia Boncodin, Grand Cross (Maringal na Krus), 23 June 1998
 Gabriel Singson, Grand Cross (Maringal na Krus), 23 June 1998
 Jose T. Almonte, Grand Cross (Maringal na Krus), 23 June 1998
 Juan Flavier, Grand Cross (Maringal na Krus), 23 June 1998
 Magtanggol Gunigundo I, Grand Cross (Maringal na Krus), 23 June 1998
 Manuel Morato, Grand Cross (Maringal na Krus), 23 June 1998
 Manuel Yan, Grand Cross (Maringal na Krus), 23 June 1998
 Renato de Villa, Grand Cross (Maringal na Krus), 23 June 1998
  Santanina Tillah Rasul, Grand Cross (Maringal na Krus), 23 June 1998

Conferred by Joseph Ejercito Estrada
 Sir Rupert Clarke, Grand Cross (Maringal na Krus), 9 March 1999

Conferred by Gloria Macapagal Arroyo
 Dr. Jacques Diouf, Grand Cross (Maringal na Krus), 20 April 2004
 Democrito Mendoza, Grand Officer (Maringal na Pinuno), 1 May 2004
 Eulogio R. Lerum, Grand Officer (Maringal na Pinuno), 1 May 2004
 Johnny Tan, Grand Officer (Maringal na Pinuno), 1 May 2004
 Emilio Yap,  Grand Cross (Maringal na Krus), 2 February 2005
 Carol Bellamy, Grand Cross (Maringal na Krus), 5 April 2005
 Natividad Relucio-Clavano, Commander  (Komandante), 14 August 2006
 Rosa Rosal, Grand Cross (Maringal na Krus), 26 October 2005
 Mohamed Bolkiah, Prince of Brunei, Grand Cross (Maringal na Krus), 7 July 2007
 Al Waleed bin Talal Al Saud, Grand Officer (Maringal na Pinuno), 2007
 Queen Letizia of Spain, Grand Cross (Maringal na Krus), 2007
 Queen Sofía of Spain, Grand Collar (Maringal na Kuwintas), 2007
 Richard Lugar,  Grand Cross (Maringal na Krus), 2008
 Daniel Inouye,  Grand Cross (Maringal na Krus), 2008
 Ted Stevens,  Grand Cross (Maringal na Krus), 2008
 Daniel Akaka, Grand Cross (Maringal na Krus), 2008
 Nancy Pelosi, Grand Cross (Maringal na Krus), 2008
 Harry Reid, Grand Cross (Maringal na Krus), 2008
 Bob Filner, Grand Cross (Maringal na Krus), 2008
 Darrell Issa, Grand Cross (Maringal na Krus), 2008
 Nicholas Alipui, Grand Cross (Maringal na Krus), 14 October 2009
  Joseph R. Pitts, Grand Cross (Maringal na Krus), 12 April 2010
 Madeleine Bordallo, Grand Cross (Maringal na Krus), 12 April 2010 
 Archbishop Paciano Aniceto, D.D., Grand Cross (Maringal na Krus), 1 June 2010

Conferred by Benigno S. Aquino III 
 Rodolfo "Dolphy" V. Quizon, Sr., Grand Collar (Maringal na Kuwintas), 2010
 Fe del Mundo, Grand Collar (Maringal na Kuwintas), 2011 (posthumous)
 Tsuneo Tanaka, Grand Cross (Maringal na Krus), 2013

Conferred by Rodrigo Duterte 
 Sr. Cecelia Wood, Grand Officer (Maringal na Pinuno), 27 September 2017
 Dr. Rabindra Abeyasinghe, Grand Officer (Maringal na Pinuno), 22 January 2022

References 

 
Golden Heart, Order of the
Golden Heart, Order of the
Awards established in 1954
Establishments by Philippine executive order